Cyclophora bipartita is a moth in the  family Geometridae. It is found in Colombia and Peru.

Subspecies
Cyclophora bipartita bipartita (Colombia)
Cyclophora bipartita montana (Prout, 1936) (Peru)

References

Moths described in 1900
bipartita
Moths of South America